Pascal is a French  and an Italian surname of Romance origin.

Origin of the surname
Pascal is a patronymic surname that derives from the personal given name Pascal, from Latin Paschalis. In France Pascal is especially found in the Southern-Eastern area, in Rhône-Alpes and Provence-Alpes-Côte d'Azur, while in Italy Pascal is found in Northern-Western area, in Piedmont, Aosta Valley and the variant De Pascal in Friuli-Venezia Giulia.

People
Adam Pascal (born 1970), American actor and singer
Amy Pascal (born 1958), American film producer.
André Pascal  (1932–2001), French songwriter and composer
Andrew Pascal (born 1965), American businessman in the gaming industry. 
Blaise Pascal (1623–1662), French mathematician and philosopher
Christine Pascal (1953 – 1996), French actress, writer and director
Dave Pascal (1918 – 2003), American cartoonist
Ernest Pascal (1896 – 1966), English-American writer
Étienne Pascal (1588–1651), French judge and amateur scientist, father of Blaise
Fabian Pascal, Romanian-American computer scientist
Francine Pascal, American author
Francoise Pascal, Mauritian actress
Gabriel Pascal, Romanian film producer and director
Gisèle Pascal, French actress
Jacqueline Pascal (1625–1661), the sister of Blaise
Jean-Claude Pascal, French singer
Jean-Thenistor Pascal, Haitian-Canadian professional boxer
John Pascal, American playwright
Julia Pascal, British playwright
Maite Orsini Pascal, Chilean actress and model
Marie-Georges Pascal, French actress
Marta Pascal (born 1983), Spanish politician
Mary Ann Pascal, American actress
Nelon Pascal, West Indian cricketer
Olivia Pascal, German actress
Paul Pascal (1839 - 1905), French landscape painter
Pedro Pascal, Chilean-American  actor
Robert A. Pascal, American politician
Zach Pascal (born 1994), American football player

Fictional characters
 Ana Pascal, the love interest of the main character from the film Stranger than Fiction (2006)
 Mattia Pascal, the main character in The Late Mattia Pascal, novel by Luigi Pirandello
 Esmée Pascal, a police officer appearing in the second season of Dexter

References

See also
Pascal (given name)
Pascal (disambiguation)

Italian-language surnames
French-language surnames